The Wire 20 Years 1982–2002 is a various artists compilation album. The 3-CD box set was released on Mute Records for the 20th anniversary of British music magazine The Wire. The tracks were selected by the magazine's publisher and former editor, Tony Herrington. It is now out of print. Andy Gill at The Independent named it one of the ten best box sets of the year.

Track listing

Personnel
 Tony Herrington – track selection, liner notes
 Tony Dixon – mastering
 Non-Format (Kjell Ekhorn and Jon Forss) – art direction, design, photography

References

External links

The Wire 20 Years 1982–2002 at AllMusic (unrated, no review)

The Wire (magazine)
2002 compilation albums
Experimental music compilation albums
Mute Records compilation albums